Pablo Martin Silva (born 6 November 1984) is a Uruguayan footballer who plays as a forward for La Luz.

Career

In 2005, Silva signed for Uruguayan top flight side Rentistas, where he suffered a broken metatarsal.

In 2008, he signed for Huracán Buceo in the Uruguayan lower leagues, but was owed money due to them going bankrupt, before joining Paraguayan lower league club Nikkei Bellmare.

In 2013, he signed for Villa Española in the Uruguayan third division, before joining Argentine fourth division team Trinidad.

Before the 2017 season, Silva signed for Comunicaciones in Guatemala.

In 2017, he signed for Uruguayan top flight outfit Danubio, where he made 11 league appearances and scored 1 goal.

Before the 2018 season, Silva returned to  Villa Española in the Uruguayan second division, where he made 11 league appearances and scored 5 goals.

References

External links
 
 Pablo Silva at playmakerstats.com

Uruguayan footballers
Expatriate footballers in Paraguay
Living people
1984 births
Uruguayan Segunda División players
Uruguayan Primera División players
Villa Española players
Uruguayan expatriate footballers
Expatriate footballers in Argentina
Uruguayan expatriates in Argentina
Footballers from Montevideo
Liga Nacional de Fútbol de Guatemala players
Comunicaciones F.C. players
Danubio F.C. players
C.A. Rentistas players
Deportivo Maldonado players
Sud América players
Expatriate footballers in Guatemala
Association football forwards
La Luz F.C. players